Liga Deportiva Universitaria de Quito's 1982 season was the club's 52nd year of existence, the 29th year in professional football and the 22nd in the top level of professional football in Ecuador.

Kits
Supplier: AdidasSponsor(s): Banco Popular

Squad

Competitions

Serie A

First stage

Results

Second stage

Results

Copa Libertadores

First stage

References
RSSSF - 1982 Serie A 
RSSSF - 1982 Copa Libertadores

External links
Official Site 
Copa Libertadores: LDU Quito (4) - Barcelona SC (2) 2nd goal 

1982